Naq or NAQ may refer to:

NAQ, IATA code for the Qaanaaq Airport
naq, ISO 639 code for the Khoekhoe language
Nouvelle-Aquitaine (NAQ), France
Negative Acts Questionnaire, a psychological test to evaluate mobbing
Nuclear Attitudes Questionnaire, a survey to evaluate nuclear anxiety
NAQ (2017–2018), the UCI team code for what is now Charente–Maritime Women Cycling

See also

 Naque, Minas Gerais, Brazil
 
 Nach (disambiguation)
 Nack (disambiguation)
 Nakh (disambiguation)
 NAC (disambiguation)
 Nak (disambiguation)
 Knack (disambiguation)